Andrew DeLuca, M.D. is a fictional character from the medical drama television series Grey's Anatomy, which airs on ABC in the United States. The character was portrayed by Giacomo Gianniotti. Gianniotti was cast in April 2015 and was promoted to series regular status in January 2016. In 2018, Gianniotti reprised his role in the spin-off series Station 19 as a guest.

Andrew was introduced as a new surgical intern at Grey Sloan Memorial Hospital at the end of the eleventh season, eventually obtaining the position of a resident in the thirteenth season. He became one of the few interns and residents in later seasons to have personal connections to the attending surgeons. Andrew struggled with the everyday life of being in a competitive profession, fitting in with his peers, and navigating personal relationships with his friends and colleagues.

Gianniotti exited the series in the seventeenth season. For his performance, Gianniotti was nominated for two Golden Maple Awards in 2016.

Development 
On April 15, 2015, it was announced that Gianniotti was cast in an undisclosed role for the final two episodes of the eleventh season, with the possibility of recurring in the twelfth season. He was promoted to the main cast on January 8, 2016, midway through the twelfth season.

The announcement of Gianniotti's casting and the character's introduction initially received backlash from some fans who felt that the character was meant to be a replacement for Derek Shepherd, a character that had recently been written off the series to accommodate the departure of actor Patrick Dempsey. However, Gianniotti denied that this was the case, saying, "I'm just a new character on the show. I'm not filling any void." He also confirmed at the time that "Andrew won't have any [romantic] intentions with Meredith [Grey] so fans don't have to worry about any threat."

In the beginning, Gianniotti struggled with the technical aspects of acting out surgeries. "My first surgery went terribly because I didn't know the protocol for so many things, and the other actors were laughing at me. I was just getting everything wrong. Like, once you're in the OR, your hands have to be by your chest, otherwise you're no longer sterile — I just didn't know that, or how to hold my instruments." However, the lack of direction allowed for Gianniotti to "fill in the blanks" of the character on his own. "I think that [Andrew] is a very honest, genuine, passionate guy. He's very driven — I relate to him a lot — and he knows he's good at what he does. I think he's more of an introvert and now he finds himself as an adult and maybe he's rediscovering who he is as a man [and] how to date women."

Background 
When Andrea "Andrew" DeLuca was young, he and his mother moved to Wisconsin from Italy while his sister Carina stayed behind with their father, Vincenzo DeLuca. Vincenzo was a renowned, but corrupt and mentally unstable surgeon in their home country. After operating in a manic state and killing four patients, Vincenzo used his connections and money to avoid prosecution, prompting his wife to leave with Andrew. At some point, Andrew's mother returned to Italy to visit Carina, where she had a stroke and died.

There is an inconsistency when DeLuca is assaulted by Alex, Maggie says she’ll call his parents because they know her, but then seasons later, they reveal that his mom is dead (and has been) and he hasn’t seen his father, who was still in Italy. 

Both DeLuca siblings speak fluent Italian and English, but due to the different settings they grew up in, Carina has an Italian accent when she speaks English and Andrew has an American accent when speaking Italian. Before becoming a doctor, Andrew worked as an EMT straight out of high school. At some point, he dated future colleague Sam Bello. Their chaotic relationship was ultimately left unresolved when Sam moved away.

Storylines 
The penultimate episode of the eleventh season "Time Stops" features the first appearance of Dr. Andrew DeLuca. In the episode, Andrew emerges from a rescue vehicle carrying patients from a tunnel collapse. At the hospital, he identifies himself as a surgeon and says that he was on his way to work at Grey Sloan Memorial Hospital when he saw the accident and joined the rescue. He quickly lends a hand in helping the victims and, because he is wearing a suit and seems confident in what he is doing, the other doctors assume that he is an attending. However, he is later revealed to be an intern, which causes the other interns to ostracize him.

Alienated from the other interns, who believe that he posed as an attending and therefore do not want to share housing with him, Andrew ends up moving in with Arizona Robbins. He also briefly dates Maggie Pierce, the Chief of Cardiothoracic Surgery, but breaks up with her out of professional intimidation. Andrew later develops feelings for Jo Wilson and takes her home from the bar when she is too drunk to drive. After getting her to bed, Jo begins to remove her clothes and causes Andrew to fall on top of her just as her boyfriend Alex Karev walks in. Alex assumes that Andrew is taking advantage of Jo and beats him nearly to death. Andrew files felony charges against Alex, which causes unease with his bosses and colleagues, most of whom have longstanding friendships with Alex. Andrew tells Arizona, Alex's friend and mentor, that he would be willing to move out, but she rejects his offer. Just as Alex is about to go to jail, Andrew retracts the charges for Jo's sake.

Andrew becomes a surgical resident as his ex-girlfriend, Sam Bello, arrives at the hospital as an intern. His sister Carina also joins the team at Grey Sloan and begins dating Andrew's roommate Arizona, much to Andrew's discomfort. Carina doesn't approve of Sam, whom she feels is a stalker. Andrew and Sam eventually rekindle their relationship until Sam leaves to avoid deportation. Heartbroken, Andrew drunkenly kisses Meredith Grey at Jo and Alex's wedding. He then realizes that his feelings for Meredith are genuine and begins to pursue her. After months of chasing her, Andrew begins a relationship with Meredith.

When Andrew's father, Vincenzo, shows up at the hospital to do research on an external womb, Andrew signs onto the project to further his surgical career. However, he soon realizes that his father's mental illness is getting in the way just as it did in the past. After the project fails, Andrew has an emotional confrontation with Vincenzo, who then departs Seattle. As his and Meredith's relationship deepens, Andrew tells her he loves her and takes the fall for her insurance fraud to prove it, landing him in prison. When Meredith visits him in jail, she says she loves him too and vows to get him out.

Once Meredith turns herself in, Andrew is released from prison and rehired at Grey Sloan. He supports Meredith through her court-mandated community service as the status of her medical license hangs in the air. During her hearing, he speaks about the nature of their relationship and, upon hearing her talk about Derek, realizes she doesn't respect him the way she did Derek. He asks her to take some time to think about what she wants, and though they briefly reconcile their relationship, he breaks up with her for good when she expresses concern about him showing signs of mania possibly brought on by bipolar disorder. In the aftermath of their breakup, Andrew appears to be continuing down a spiral, worrying Carina, who recognizes the similarities in Andrew's behavior to that of their father's. Despite his mania progressively getting worse, Andrew was able to diagnose Richard Webber's illness, cobalt poisoning, when no one else could. This career altering diagnosis occurred at the end of the 16th season.

In Season 17, Andrew became an attending and has seemingly recovered from his mental illness. In the episode "Helplessly Hoping," Andrew dies after being stabbed by an accomplice of Opal, a human trafficker whom Andrew had recognized previously. He had followed Opal and called the police to arrest her, and when the police refused to help due to red tape, he called Maya at Station 19 while inside a car with Carina, who immediately comes to help. His efforts lead to Opal's arrest, but he was already injured. He is taken into emergency surgery at Grey Sloan Memorial Hospital and initially recovers and wakes up, but he then starts to code and is rushed into his second surgery, where his time of death is called at 22:50. He then appears in Meredith's "afterlife" dream sequence on a beach that she experiences, while comatose, due to COVID-19. There, Andrew and Meredith say their good-byes and we see Andrew reunited with his deceased mother.

Reception 
Despite initial skepticism, the character has been received positively. Rebecca Farley of Refinery29 described DeLuca's reputation as "passionate, handsome, and a bit of an idiot." She also cited the fact that the intern had remained on the show after multiple seasons as proof that the "Rhimesian jury" had ruled in his favor, affirming the character's likability. Elite Dailys Rachel Chapman called the character "charming" and said that "he truly handles stuff like a pro."

In 2016, Gianniotti was nominated for Best Actor in a TV Series Broadcast in the U.S. and Newcomer of the Year in a TV Series Broadcast in the U.S. at the Golden Maple Awards.

References 

Fictional surgeons
Grey's Anatomy characters
Television characters introduced in 2015
Fictional characters with bipolar disorder
Fictional characters with psychiatric disorders
Male characters in television
Crossover characters in television